Richard Strachan (born 18 November 1986) is a British personal trainer, former athlete who competed in sprinting, and former boxer. During his time in athletics, Strachan has represented Great Britain at World and European Championships, winning two European Golds and a European Silver medal. Strachan mainly specialized in the 400 metres distance as seen from his involvement in the British team during the European indoor championships on several occasions.

Following his departure from athletics, Strachan has become a strength coach, coaching YouTubers such as Vikkstar123, TBJZL, and Manny. Strachan owns a YouTube channel with 62,000 subscribers, posting both sprinting and strength training videos with the YouTubers.

Amateur Boxing Record

References

External links
 

1986 births
Living people
British male sprinters